Leucadendron sheilae, the Lokenberg conebush, is a flower-bearing shrub that belongs to the genus Leucadendron and forms part of the fynbos, a South African biogeographical region.

DescriptionL. sheilae is a small shrub with narrow leaves which are widest near their tips (oblanceolate). The male flowers are small and green, with a foetid scent. The female flowers, also green, are roughly spherical (or "globose") florets which cluster together in larger inflorescences borne on hairless stems.

Distribution and habitat

Reproduction The shrub is dioecious (individual plants have either all male or all female flowers), with unisexual flowers which are pollinated by insects.

Spread L. sheilae plants die after fire; the seeds survive. The seeds are borne in cones on the female plant and are released when ripe. Rodents collect the ripe seed and store in underground caches, which protects the seed from fire.

Ecology and threats

References

External links 
 
 

sheilae